Liu Wei-chen (born 29 October 1994) is a Taiwanese male badminton player. In 2015, he reach the final of the Sydney International Challenge tournament, but was defeated by the Malaysian pair in the rubber game with the score 2–1. He won his first international title at the 2016 Maurice's Pools and Spas Waikato International tournament in the men's doubles event partnered with Yang Po-han.

Achievements

BWF International Challenge/Series
Men's Doubles

 BWF International Challenge tournament
 BWF International Series tournament
 BWF Future Series tournament

References

External links
 

Living people
1994 births
Taiwanese male badminton players